The National Archive Department of the Republic of Azerbaijan is a governmental agency within the Cabinet of Azerbaijan in charge of managing, maintaining, protecting and updating national archives of Azerbaijan. The agency is headed by Atakhan Pashayev.

History
After occupation of the Azerbaijan Democratic Republic in 1920, the Bolsheviks established the State Archives Fund under the People's Commissariat for Education which started its activities in 1921. In 1922, the management of the archives was passed to the Bureau of Central Executive Committee of Azerbaijan SSR. In 1925, similar archives department was created in Nakhchivan. Starting from 1928, regional chapters of the state archives department were created throughout the republic.
In 1930, the Central Committee of the Communist Party established the Central Archives Department, which was made up of Central State October Revolution Archives and Central State Historical Archives. In 1938, the management of the archives was passed under jurisdiction of the Ministry of Internal Affairs and in 1960 it was subordinated to the Cabinet of Ministers. In 1966, State Literature and Arts Archives of Azerbaijan SSR was created.

The National Archive Department was established on December 2, 2002 by the Presidential Decree No. 816 on the basis of an existing Main Archives Department of the Cabinet of Ministers, which had been in existence since March 11, 1994 in order to modernize the management and maintenance of national archives of Azerbaijan. Its statute was approved on September 27, 2003 by President Heydar Aliyev. The agency ensures implementation of state policies in relation to updating and maintaining national archives through its direct activities in collection and preservation of data and documents as well as through it regional chapters and the national archives of Nakhchivan Autonomous Republic of Azerbaijan. The activities of the department are financed through funds allocated from the state budget of Azerbaijan.

Structure
The agency is headed by its chief and the department collegium. The collegium is chaired by the chief of National Archive Department, and his deputy. The archive department has two main bodies: the Scientific Council and Central Expert Verification Commission. Main functions of the agency are participation in policy building in regards to management of national archives; ensuring acceptance, protection and careful use of the archival documents related to cultural heritage and history of Azerbaijan as well as documents of scientific, historical, social, economic, importance; collection, categorization, accounting and management of archival resources; continuously modifying the archives management system in accordance with international standards; writing progress reports to the government of Azerbaijan on the status of state archives. Currently, there are 6 state archives under central management of the National Archive Department, 15 regional chapters and State Archives of Nakhchivan Autonomous Republic.

Chronology 
In 1920, the Decree "On the Establishment of the Unified State Archive Foundation and the Organization of the Central State Archive under the Public Education Commissariat" was signed.

In 1921, the Central State Archive of Azerbaijan started functioning as the first state archive in the Caucasus.

In 1922, the leadership of the Central State Archives was directly given to the Presidium of the Central Executive Committee of Azerbaijan.

In 1925, the Central Archive of the Nakhchivan Autonomous Republic created.

İn 1928 establishment of accidental archive bureaus in Azerbaijan.

In 1930 the activity of the Archives was expanded and the Presidium of the Central Executive Committee of the Azerbaijan SSR made a decision on the establishment of the Republican Central Archive Office and approved its regulation. Two central state archives:  The Central State Archive of October Revolution and Central State Historical Archive were established in April of the same year by the Presidium of the Central Executive Committee of the Azerbaijan SSR on the basis of the central archive created in 1920.

In 1938, Archive Organizations were given under supervision of the Commissariat of Internal Affairs in Azerbaijan.

In 1960 archive organizations were given under supervision of the Council of Ministers of the Republic of Azerbaijan.

The Art Archive and Central State Literature of the Azerbaijan SSR was established in 1966.

during 1986-1969 Central State Archive of Recorded Sound of the Azerbaijan, Central State Archive of Science, Technology and Medical Documents and branches of the Central State October Revolution Archives in 15 city and regional centers were created and 50 regional state archives were changed to variable archives for implementing temporary protection of documents archives.

In 1999 the Law of Azerbaijan "On National Archive Foundation" was adopted.

In 2002, the National Archive Office of the Azerbaijani Republic was established "On Improving the Archival Works in the Republic of Azerbaijan" on the basis of the General Archive Department under the Cabinet of Ministers of the Azerbaijani Republic by the Decree of the President of Azerbaijan.

At present, the archive system of the Republic of Azerbaijan includes 6 state archives, 15 branches of state archives, state archives of Nakhchivan Autonomous Republic, as well as 55 city and regional state archives.

Statement

Duties 
To participate in the formulation of state policy in the field of archive work and to provide its implementation;

To provide accepting documents including to Azerbaijan State Archive foundation, reflecting the material and spiritual lifestyle of people, related to important fields such as historical, scientific, social, economic, political, cultural, artistic and other, and documents located outside of Azerbaijan but belonging to Azerbaijan.

To participate in the preparation of uniform principles for compilation, accounting and utilization of documents of the National Archive Foundation of the Azerbaijan;

To regulate developing archive work in the Republic and scientific and technical progress in this field, providing methodological assistance to state archives and non-state archives;

To coordinate the organization of archive work in state bodies of Azerbaijan;

To analyze the state archive work in the country, to prepare the concept and strategy of its development, taking into account the aspects of the field;

To create international relations in the field of archive work, to study and to spread the experience of archives of foreign countries in this field;

Fulfill other duties given to the Department by the legislation of the Azerbaijan Republic;

Functions 
The National Archive Department organizes the collection and protection of the documents of the National Archive Fund of the Republic of Azerbaijan, and oversees the issuance of state archives in accordance with the established rules; carries out centralized state accounting of the fund's documents, provides control over the protection and use of these documents, carries out measures with the relevant state agencies to improve the management archives network and to improve the organization of their work. It also participates in the preparation of normative legal acts on the collection, accounting, protection and use of the documents of the National Archive Fund. The Department prepares a draft state program on archive business development and approves its implementation, sectorial programs, perspective and current plans, and ensures their implementation. In addition, the functions of the Department also include to regulate the structure and network of state archives, as well as to define the circle of documents of republican significance in the background in accordance with the law "On National Archive Fund" and to incorporate them into the state archives of the Republic of Azerbaijan.

Rights 
The National Archives Department has the rights to require the central and local executive authorities, as well as the administrations, organizations and enterprises to provide the Department with the necessary materials about their archives, to adopt normative legal acts for the central and local executive authorities on the organization of the archives in accordance with the established procedure. At the same time it can coordinate field standards, lists, guidelines, rules and curricula developed by public authorities on the organization of archive business; announce competitions for the best works in the field of archival, documentary and archeography in accordance with legislation and determine the terms of the competition; approve the regulations governing the operation of its subordinate institutions and organizations; engage in publishing and to establish its own periodical press in accordance with legislation.

See also
Cabinet of Azerbaijan
National Library of Azerbaijan
List of archives in Azerbaijan
List of national archives

References

External links
  

Azerbaijan
Archives in Azerbaijan
Government agencies of Azerbaijan
Government agencies established in 2002
2002 establishments in Azerbaijan